Blas de Laserna Nieva (1751 in Corella, Navarra – 1816 in Madrid) was a Spanish composer.

Biography
Laserna was one of the most prolific and popular songwriters of late eighteenth and early nineteenth century Spain.

As an educator, he championed traditional Spanish musical forms, but as a theatrical impresario gave in to the public taste for Italian forms.

He composed several operas and concertos, as well as incidental music for several comedies in the popular Spanish theater.  A prolific songwriter, his creative oeuvre contains more than five hundred songs (tonadillas), many with lyrics by Ramón de la Cruz.

While Conductor of the orchestra of the Teatro de la Cruz, he premiered his operetta, La Gitanilla Por Amor (The Gypsy Girl For Love), in 1791.

Enrique Granados used the melody from his "La Tirana del Tripili" as the basis for "Los Requiebros" in his Goyescas suite.

References

1751 births
1816 deaths
18th-century classical composers
18th-century male musicians
18th-century conductors (music)
19th-century classical composers
19th-century conductors (music)
Spanish classical composers
Spanish male classical composers
Spanish opera composers
Spanish conductors (music)
Male opera composers
Male conductors (music)
Musicians from Madrid
Musicians from Navarre